The 369th Bombardment Squadron is an inactive United States Air Force unit.  Its last assignment was with the 306th Bombardment Wing stationed at MacDill Air Force Base, Florida.

History
Established as a B-17 Flying Fortress heavy bomb group in early 1942.   Trained under Second Air Force before deploying to England in September 1942, becoming one of the first heavy bomber squadrons of the VIII Bomber Command 1st Bombardment Division.   Highly decorated squadron during Air Offensive over Nazi Germany and occupied Europe, engaging in strategic bombardment operations until the end of the war in Europe, April 1945.  Assisted in demobilizing personnel using B-17s as transports along ATC routes from Western Europe, Italy and the United Kingdom to North Africa.

Reassigned to United States Air Forces in Europe occupation forces in late 1945.  Engaged in photographic mapping and strategic reconnaissance operations over Western occupation zones of Germany as well as Soviet zone.   Reassigned to Istes, France where it demobilized at the end of 1946.

Reactivated as a Strategic Air Command B-29 Superfortress squadron at MacDill AFB, Florida in 1948.   Began upgrading to the new B-50 Superfortress, an advanced version of the B-29 in 1950. The B-50 gave the unit the capability to  carry heavy loads of conventional weapons faster and farther as well as being designed for atomic bomb missions if necessary.

Began receiving the first production models of the new Boeing B-47 Stratojet jet bomber in 1951 and despite initial difficulties, the Stratojet became the mainstay of the medium-bombing strength of SAC all throughout the 1950s.  Began sending its B-47s to AMARC at Davis–Monthan in 1963 when the aircraft was deemed no longer capable of penetrating Soviet airspace. Inactivated in 1963 with phaseout of the B-47.

Lineage
 Constituted 369th Bombardment Squadron (Heavy) on 28 January 1942
 Activated on 1 March 1942
 Inactivated on 25 December 1946
 Redesignated 369th Bombardment Squadron (Very Heavy) on 11 June 1947
 Activated on 1 July 1947
 Redesignated 369th Bombardment Squadron (Medium) on 11 August 1948
 Inactivated on 1 April 1963

Assignments
 306th Bombardment Group, 1 March 1942 – 25 December 1946
 ETO Fuselage Code: WW
 306th Bombardment Group, 1 July 1947
 306th Bombardment Wing, 16 June 1952 – 1 April 1963
 Not operational, 3 January-1 April 1963

Stations

 Gowen Field, Idaho, 1 March 1942
 Wendover Field, Utah, c. 6 April-1 August 1942
 RAF Thurleigh, England, c. 6 September 1942
 Detachment operated from: Istres-Le Tubé Air Base, France, 31 August–September 1945
 Detachment operated from: Marrakech Airport, French Morocco, 6 September 1945 – January 1946

 AAF Station Giebelstadt, Germany, 25 December 1945
 Istres-Le Tubé Air Base, France, 26 February-29 June 1946
 Andrews Field, Maryland, 1 July 1947
 MacDill AFB, Florida,1 August 1948 – 1 April 1963

Aircraft
 B-17 Flying Fortress, 1942–1946
 B-29 Superfortress, 1948–1951
 B-50 Superfortress, 1950–1951
 B-47 Stratojet, 1951–1963

References

 

Military units and formations established in 1942
Bombardment squadrons of the United States Army Air Forces